Nicholas Murphy Noonan (born May 4, 1989) is an American former professional baseball infielder. He played in Major League Baseball (MLB) for the San Francisco Giants and the San Diego Padres.

Career

San Francisco Giants
Noonan attended Francis W. Parker School in San Diego, California. He was named to the Aflac All-American West team. The Giants selected Noonan with their first round pick, 32nd overall, of the 2007 MLB Draft. He signed for $1 million, bypassing a commitment to attend Clemson University.

After the 2012 season, the Giants added Noonan to their 40-man roster.

Noonan was added to the Giants' Opening Day 25-man roster just prior to the 2013 season. He had his first MLB at bat on April 3, 2013 against the Los Angeles Dodgers in Dodger Stadium. In the top of the 9th inning, he grounded out to the 2nd baseman to end the inning. Noonan would go on to hit for an average of .219 in a limited number of plate appearances (111) in 62 games.

Noonan was designated for assignment on July 25, 2014.

New York Yankees
He signed a minor league deal with the New York Yankees before the 2015 season.

Second stint with Giants
He was released in July, and signed a minor league deal with the Giants on August 6. The Giants promoted Noonan to the major leagues on September 1. Noonan hit his first major league home run on September 30.

San Diego Padres
Noonan signed with the San Diego Padres organization for the 2016 season. After playing for the El Paso Chihuahuas, the Padres promoted Noonan to the major leagues on August 10, fulfilling his childhood dream to play for the Padres.

Milwaukee Brewers
On February 14, 2017, Noonan signed a minor league contract with the Milwaukee Brewers. He was assigned to the Triple-A Colorado Springs Sky Sox.

Miami Marlins
On May 11, 2017, he was traded to the Miami Marlins. He played 23 games with the Triple-A New Orleans Baby Cakes.

Second stint with Brewers
He was traded back to the Brewers on June 16. He elected free agency after the season.

Oakland Athletics
Noonan signed a minor league contract with the Oakland Athletics with an invitation to spring training for the 2018 season. He was assigned to the Triple-A Nashville Sounds. He was released on March 30, 2018.

Texas Rangers
On April 14, 2018, Noonan signed a minor league contract with the Texas Rangers. He elected free agency on November 2, 2018.

References

External links

1989 births
Living people
People from Poway, California
Baseball players from San Diego
Major League Baseball infielders
San Francisco Giants players
San Diego Padres players
Arizona League Giants players
Augusta GreenJackets players
San Jose Giants players
Richmond Flying Squirrels players
Fresno Grizzlies players
Sacramento River Cats players
Scranton/Wilkes-Barre RailRiders players
El Paso Chihuahuas players
Colorado Springs Sky Sox players
New Orleans Baby Cakes players
Round Rock Express players
Frisco RoughRiders players
Arizona League Rangers players